Tal como somos (English title: Such as we are) is a Mexican telenovela produced by Julissa and Juan Osorio for Televisa in 1987. It is an original story by Carlos Olmos and Enrique Serna and was directed by Antonio Acevedo.

Julissa and José Alonso starred as protagonists, while Alejandra Ávalos and Enrique Álvarez Félix starred as antagonists. Leticia Calderón and Eduardo Palomo starred as stellar performances.

Plot
Ángel is a fisherman from Mazatlán who has become widowed. He moves with his family to Mexico City in search of fortune. When they arrive, the family is assaulted, and the thieves cut off the ears of Ángel's daughter Margarita in order to take her earrings. After this ominous beginning, the fisherman and his family  settle in a building where they meet Eva, a very unhappy woman who is tortured by her husband and daughter. Miguel, her disabled husband, pretends to be a good person but is a born criminal. Years ago, he raped a woman and Eva not only forgave him but raised the child as her own.

Miguel blames Eva for his accident and has poisoned her daughter Delia against her. Delia's father has such a strong hold on her that she is practically "in love" with him. She hates Eva, and as a manifestation of her morbid nature, she spies on her parents when Miguel vainly tries to make love to his wife. This is another mental torture inflicted on Eva because, in reality, Miguel only pretends to be disabled. Eva, frustrated as a wife, mother, and woman, finds true passion in the arms of Ángel.

Cast

Awards

References

External links

1987 telenovelas
Mexican telenovelas
1987 Mexican television series debuts
1988 Mexican television series endings
Spanish-language telenovelas
Television shows set in Mexico City
Televisa telenovelas